John Krepps Miller (May 25, 1819 – August 11, 1863) was an American lawyer and politician who served as a two-term U.S. Representative from Ohio from 1847 to 1851.

Biography 
Born in Mount Vernon, Ohio, Miller attended the public schools.
He was graduated from Jefferson College, Canonsburg, Pennsylvania (now Washington & Jefferson College, in 1838.
He studied law.
He was admitted to the bar in 1841 and commenced practice in Mount Vernon, Ohio.

Politics
He served as delegate to the Democratic National Convention in 1844.

Miller was elected as a Democrat to the Thirtieth and Thirty-first Congresses (March 4, 1847 – March 3, 1851).

Death
He died in Mount Vernon, Ohio, on August 11, 1863.
He was interred in Mound View Cemetery.

Sources

1819 births
1863 deaths
Washington & Jefferson College alumni
People from Mount Vernon, Ohio
Ohio lawyers
19th-century American politicians
19th-century American lawyers
Democratic Party members of the United States House of Representatives from Ohio